Zighoud Youcef District is a district in Constantine Province, Algeria. It was named after its capital, Zighoud Youcef.

Municipalities
The district is further divided into 2 municipalities:
Zighoud Youcef
Béni Hamidane

Districts of Constantine Province